Sakania is a town in Haut-Katanga Province, in the Congo Pedicle, in the far south of the Democratic Republic of Congo, near the border with Zambia. It is located at an elevation of 1278m asl, therefore it has a cool climate.
Between 1935 and 1939 it recorded one of the lowest temperatures in the history of the country, with -1.5 °C.

The town is close to Frontier copper mine, one of the largest in the country.

On the other side of the near borderline is the Zambian city of Ndola in the Copperbelt Province.

Transport 

The city is served by the operating sections of the Cape to Cairo Railway. It has a station on the railway between Ndola in the south and Lubumbashi in the north-west.

See also 

 Transport in DRC

References 

Populated places in Haut-Katanga Province
Democratic Republic of the Congo–Zambia border